Lasthenia microglossa is a species of flowering plant in the family Asteraceae known by the common name smallray goldfields. It is endemic to California, where it grows in shady areas in a number of habitats.

Description
Lasthenia microglossa is a small annual herb growing sprawling stems along the ground or erect to a maximum height near 25 centimeters. The stems are hairy and may be branched or unbranched. The hairy leaves are generally linear in shape and are up to 8 centimeters long, paired oppositely on the stem.

The flower is less than a centimeter across and is mostly made up of golden yellow disc florets. If there are ray florets they are less than a millimeter long.

The fruit is a hairy achene a few millimeters long, sometimes with a pappus of tiny scales.

External links
Jepson Manual Treatment
USDA Plants Profile
Photo gallery

microglossa
Endemic flora of California
Flora without expected TNC conservation status